The 2022–23 season is the 115th season in the history of Real Betis and their eighth consecutive season in the top flight. The club are participating in La Liga, the Copa del Rey, Supercopa de España, and the UEFA Europa League.

Players

First-team squad 
.

Reserve team

Out on loan

Transfers

In

Out

Pre-season and friendlies

Competitions

Overall record

La Liga

League table

Results summary

Results by round

Matches 
The league fixtures were announced on 23 June 2022.

Copa del Rey

Supercopa de España

UEFA Europa League

Group stage 

The draw for the group stage was held on 26 August 2022.

Knockout phase

Round of 16 
The draw for the round of 16 was held on 24 February 2023.

Statistics

Appearances and goals
Last updated 3 November 2022.

|-
! colspan=14 style=background:#dcdcdc; text-align:center|Goalkeepers

|-
! colspan=14 style=background:#dcdcdc; text-align:center|Defenders

|-
! colspan=14 style=background:#dcdcdc; text-align:center|Midfielders

|-
! colspan=14 style=background:#dcdcdc; text-align:center|Forwards

|-
! colspan=14 style=background:#dcdcdc; text-align:center| Players who have made an appearance or had a squad number this season but have left the club either permanently or on loan
|-
|}

References

Real Betis seasons
Real Betis
Real Betis